The 2019–20 season is TRAU's first season  in the I-League after winning the I-League 2nd Division. This season they are participating in the I-League, Durand Cup and Indian Super Cup.

Senior team squad

Transfers

Transfers in

Transfers out

Current technical staff 
As of 11 January 2019.

I league

Competitions

I-league

league Table

Result summary

Results by round

Matches

2019 Durand Cup

Group D

Goalscorers

References 

TRAU
TRAU FC seasons